Celia Lovsky (born Cäcilia Josefina Lvovsky, February 21, 1897 – October 12, 1979) was an Austrian-American actress. She was born in Vienna, daughter of Břetislav Lvovsky (1857–1910), a minor Czech opera composer. She studied theater, dance, and languages at the Austrian Royal Academy of Arts and Music. She is best known to fans of Star Trek as the original T'Pau, and to fans of The Twilight Zone as the aged daughter of an eternally youthful Hollywood actress.

Life and career 

Lovsky married journalist Heinrich Vinzenz Nowak in 1919. By 1925, they were apparently estranged and she was romantically involved with playwright Arthur Schnitzler. She later moved to Berlin, where she acted in the surrealist plays Dream Theater and Dream Play by Karl Kraus. There, in 1929, she met Peter Lorre, who had seen her in a production of Shakespeare's Othello near Vienna. The couple traveled to Paris, London, and the United States. Lovsky was instrumental in bringing Lorre to the attention of Fritz Lang, leading eventually to Lorre's appearance in the film M (1931) directed by Lang. They lived together for five years before their marriage, and stayed married until 1945, remaining close friends for the rest of Lorre's life.

After the couple settled in Santa Monica, California, Lorre had not wished Lovsky to work, believing he should be the breadwinner and she should remain at home. For the rest of Lorre's life, she was his publicist, manager, secretary, financial planner, nurse and confidant. However, after their divorce, she started taking roles in American movies and television. She made a name for herself playing slightly exotic roles such as the deaf-mute mother of Lon Chaney in Man of a Thousand Faces (1957) with James Cagney and as Apache Princess Saba in the 1955 film Foxfire starring Jane Russell and Jeff Chandler.

As she grew older, she was given dignified dowager roles, such as a Spanish matriarch in an episode of Bonanza titled "The Spanish Grant" (1960) and Have Gun Will Travel titled "The Man Who Wouldn't Talk" (1958) (with Charles Bronson), Romany matriarchs, elderly Native American women such as in the Wagon Train episode "A Man Called Horse", expatriate Russian princesses, and a brief but memorable role as the widowed mother of Reinhard Schwimmer, one of the victims in the film The St. Valentine's Day Massacre (1967). Her final movie appearance was of the "Exchange Leader" in Soylent Green (1973). She delivers the final confirmation to Edward G. Robinson's character Sol about Soylent Green's true ingredient.

She is particularly well-known for two of her television appearances:  the Twilight Zone episode "Queen of the Nile" (1964), in which she played the elderly daughter of a never-aging actress (played by Ann Blyth); and she was the original T'Pau, the Vulcan diplomat, judge, and philosopher who presides at Mr. Spock's wedding in the Star Trek episode "Amok Time" (1967).

Partial filmography 

 1930 Twice Married as Fraulein Koch
 1930 Der Hampelmann as Unknown
 1947 The Foxes of Harrow as Minna Ludenbach (uncredited)
 1948 Letter from an Unknown Woman as Flower Vendor (uncredited)
 1948 Sealed Verdict as Emma Steigmann
 1948 The Snake Pit as Inmate Gertrude (uncredited)
 1949 Flaming Fury as Bertha Polacheck
 1949 Chicago Deadline as Mrs. Schleffler (uncredited)
 1950 Captain Carey, U.S.A. as Countess Francesca de Cresci
 1950 Bright Leaf as Dressmaker (uncredited)
 1950 The Killer That Stalked New York as Mrs. Kowalski (uncredited)
 1951 The Scarf as Mrs. Barrington (uncredited)
 1951 Night Into Morning as Mrs. Niemoller
 1951 The People Against O'Hara as Mrs. Korvac (uncredited)
 1952 Because You're Mine as Mrs. Rossano
 1953 The Story of Three Loves as The Governess On Ship (segment "The Jealous Lover / Mademoiselle") (uncredited)
 1953 The Blue Gardenia May, The Flower Woman (uncredited)
 1953 Champ for a Day as Gladys Macrowitz (uncredited)
 1953 The Big Heat as Lagana's Mother In Portrait (uncredited)
 1954 Rhapsody as Frau Sigerlist
 1954 Make Haste to Live as Mother
 1954 Three Coins in the Fountain as Baroness (uncredited)
 1954 The Last Time I Saw Paris as Mama
 1955 New York Confidential as Mama Lupo
 1955 Foxfire as Princess Saba
 1955 Duel on the Mississippi as Celeste Tulane
 1955 Texas Lady as Mrs. Gantz (uncredited)
 1956 While the City Sleeps as Miss Dodd
 1956 The Opposite Sex as Lutsi (uncredited)
 1956 Death of a Scoundrel as Mrs. Sabourin, Clementi's Mother
 1956 Rumble on the Docks as Anna Smigelski
 1957 The Garment Jungle as Tulio's Mother
 1957 Trooper Hook as Señora Sandoval
 1957 Man of a Thousand Faces as Mrs. Chaney
 1958 Crash Landing as Mrs. Ortega
 1958 Twilight for the Gods as Ida Morris
 1958 Have Gun Will Travel ("The Man Who Wouldn't Talk") as Aunt Anna
 1958-1960 Playhouse 90 as First Woman / Madam Guibert / Elsa Lindnow / Mrs. Schwimmer
 1959 I Mobster as Mme. Arle
 1959 Alfred Hitchcock Presents ("The Kind Waitress") as Mrs. Mannerheim
 1959 The Gene Krupa Story as Mother
 1962 Hitler as Frau Angelika Raubal
 1962 The Alfred Hitchcock Hour ("The Black Curtain") as Mrs. Fisher, Apartment Complex Manager
 1963 The New Phil Silvers Show ("Little Old Gluemaker, Me") as Frieda
 1964 The Twilight Zone ("Queen of the Nile" as Viola Draper
 1965 36 Hours as Elsa
 1965 The Greatest Story Ever Told as Woman Behind Railings (uncredited)
 1965 Harlow as Marie Ouspenskaya
 1967 The St. Valentine's Day Massacre as Josephine Schwimmer
 1967 The Flying Nun ("Wailing in a Winter Wonderland") as Sister Olaf
 1968 The Power as Mrs. Hallson
 1970 Airport as Mrs. Williams, Passenger (uncredited)
 1973 Soylent Green as The Exchange Leader

References

Bibliography

External links
 

 

1897 births
1979 deaths
20th-century American actresses
20th-century Austrian actresses
Actresses from Berlin
Actresses from Vienna
Austrian stage actresses
American film actresses
American television actresses
Austrian emigrants to the United States
People with acquired American citizenship